Sisaket United Football Club (Thai:สโมสรฟุตบอลศรีสะเกษ ยูไนเต็ด ) is a Thai semi professional football club based in Sisaket Province, and They currently play in Thai League 3 North Eastern Region.

History
The club was founded as Sisaket United Football Club in 2012.they entered and played Regional League Division 2 (North Eastern Region). Purpose of the establishment of this club is to want the people of Sisaket and youth to become interested in sports and to push the youth in the province to develop their football skills at the national level.
In 2020-2021, Requested for Postponement the team to rest Due to the COVID-19 pandemic in Thailand and budget issues.
In 2021-2022 The club returned to send the team again in the 2021–22 Thai League 3 Northeastern Region

Stadium and locations

Season by season record

P = Played
W = Games won
D = Games drawn
L = Games lost
F = Goals for
A = Goals against
Pts = Points
Pos = Final position

QR1 = First Qualifying Round
QR2 = Second Qualifying Round
R1 = Round 1
R2 = Round 2
R3 = Round 3
R4 = Round 4

R5 = Round 5
R6 = Round 6
QF = Quarter-finals
SF = Semi-finals
RU = Runners-up
W = Winners

Players

First team squad

Coaching staff

Coaches
Coaches by years (2012–present)

 Surasak Chumphontri 
 Jongkol Chanpuang 
 Suriyan Jamchen 
 Preeda Chankra 
 Harnnarong Chunhakunakron 
 Preeda Chankra 
 Harnnarong Chunhakunakron 
 Preeda Chankra 
 Harnnarong Chunhakunakron 
 Preeda Chankra 
 Pramoul Thinkatork

Honours

Domestic leagues
 Thai League 4 North Eastern Region
 Winners (1): 2017

External links
 Official website of Sisaket United FC
 Official Facebookpage of Sisaket United FC

Association football clubs established in 2012
Football clubs in Thailand
Sisaket province
2012 establishments in Thailand